Maidenhead railway station serves the town of Maidenhead, Berkshire, England.

It is served by local services operated by Great Western Railway and the Elizabeth line, and is also the junction for the Marlow Branch Line. It has five platforms which are accessed through ticket barriers at both entrances to the station. The Marlow line platform had an overall roof until 2014 when it was removed in the course of electrification works.

History

The station is on the original line of the Great Western Railway, which opened as far as Reading in 1840. The original Maidenhead Station lay east of the Thames, not far from the present  station. This was the line's first terminus, pending the completion of the Sounding Arch (Maidenhead Railway Bridge) bridge over the river. However, there was no station on the present site until 1871, when local contractor William Woodbridge built it. Originally, it was called "Maidenhead Junction", but eventually it came to replace the Boyn Hill station as well as the original station on the Maidenhead Riverside.

In 2008 the station underwent major renovation works and in 2010 a statue of Nicholas Winton was installed on one of the platforms.

In 2010 a statue was erected to honour the man dubbed the "British Schindler" for his work saving Jewish children from Nazi invasion. Sir Nicholas Winton was 29 when he smuggled 669 boys and girls, destined for concentration camps, out of Czechoslovakia in 1939. The statue, on platform three, depicts Winton sitting on a bench reading his famous scrapbook, which contained lists of all the children he helped to save.

Crossrail
Initially, the planned western terminus for the Crossrail project was Maidenhead, but an announcement was made in 2014 that it would be Reading. Some peak Elizabeth line trains terminate at Maidenhead, with two per hour continuing to Reading, so sidings have been built at Maidenhead to support this.

The station has undergone significant modification, including the replacement of the existing passenger waiting facilities, a new ticket hall, lifts, platform extensions to accommodate the longer trains, the introduction of overhead line equipment and the construction of new stabling and turnback facilities to the west of the station.

Platform layout
The main entrance to the station is on the A308 with a back entrance on Shoppenhangers Road. The station has five through platforms and no terminating platforms:
 Platform 1 - For westbound trains on the main line. This platform is mainly used during peak times, as outside these times few trains on the main line stop at Maidenhead. It is outside of the ticket barriers at Shoppenhangers Road and the gate to the platform is only opened when a train is due to arrive.
 Platform 2 - For eastbound trains on the main line. This platform is mainly used during peak times, as outside these times few trains on the main line stop at Maidenhead.
 Platform 3 - For westbound trains on the relief line. The concourse is shared with platform 2.
 Platform 4 - For eastbound trains on the relief line.
 Platform 5 - For trains serving the Marlow branch line. Trains either begin/terminate here or continue to or from London on the relief line. This shares a concourse with platform 4.

Services 
All trains at Maidenhead are operated by Great Western Railway and the Elizabeth line. The typical off-peak service is:
 4tph to Abbey Wood
 2tph to 
 2tph to 
 2tph to 
 1tph to 

References

Bibliography

External links

Buildings and structures in the Royal Borough of Windsor and Maidenhead
Railway stations in Berkshire
Great Western Main Line
Former Great Western Railway stations
Railway stations in Great Britain opened in 1871
Railway stations served by Great Western Railway
Railway stations served by the Elizabeth line
Maidenhead
DfT Category C1 stations